Seán Buckley may refer to:

 Seán Buckley (politician) (died 1963), Irish politician
 Seán Buckley (hurler) (born 1938), Irish retired hurler
 Sean Buckley (entrepreneur), Australian entrepreneur, thoroughbred racehorse owner and investor
 Sean Buckley (producer), Canadian producer and director